Madame Aema 5 (애마부인 5 (1991) - Aema Buin 5) is a 1991 South Korean film directed by Suk Do-won. It was the fifth entry in the Madame Aema series, the longest-running film series in Korean cinema.

PLot
Continuing the storyline started in Madame Aema 4, Aema's husband is still carrying on an affair with the Japanese woman, Hanako. After much romantic complication, just as Aema decides to divorce her husband she discovers that he has died in Japan because of Hanako.

Cast
 So Bi-a: Aema
 Choi Dong-joon: husband
 Jeon Hye-seong: Erica
 Choe Ho-jin: Ho-jin
 Yeon Hyeon-cheol: Hwa-ga
 Min Hui: Hanako
 Lee Jeong-yeol: Jung-hun
 Sin Jin-hui: Ju-hee
 Jeong Young-kuk
 Kim Gi-jong

Bibliography

English

Korean

Notes

Madame Aema
1991 films
1990s erotic films
1990s Korean-language films
South Korean sequel films